Abburi Ravi is an Indian screenwriter who works in Telugu films. He received Nandi Award for Best Dialogue Writer for Bommarillu (2006).

Early life 
Ravi was born and brought up in Bhimavaram, Andhra Pradesh. He graduated in BSc from graduated DNR College, Bhimavaram. After completed Master of Business Administration from Nagarjuna University, he started working in an advertising agency.

In 2001, director Trivikram Srinivas who was a classmate of him offered Ravi to work as an assistant director. Ravi obliged and worked for Nuvve Nuvve (2001). which began his film career.

Filmography 

 Ela Cheppanu (2003)
 Pallakilo Pellikoothuru (2004)
 Bhageeratha (2005)
 Ashok (2006)
 Bommarillu (2006)
 Annavaram (2006)
 Classmates (2007)
 Athidhi (2007)
 Don (2007)
 Bhale Dongalu (2008)
 Konchem Ishtam Konchem Kashtam (2009)
 Kick (2009)
 Ganesh (2009)
 Mr.Perfect (2011)
 Kudirithe Kappu Coffee (2011)
 Dhada (2011)
 Snehithudu (2011)
 Panjaa (2011)
 Yevadu (2013)
  Kerintha  (2015)
 Cheekati Rajyam (2015)
 Kshanam (2016)
 Oopiri (2016)
 Hyper (2016)
 Ekkadiki Pothavu Chinnavada (2016)
 Winner (2017)
 Yuddham Sharanam (2017)
 Goodachari (2018)
 Operation Gold Fish(2019)
  Chanakya (2019)
 Evaru(2019)
 Disco Raja (2020)
 Major (2022)
 Itlu Maredumilli Prajaneekam (2022)

References

Living people
Telugu screenwriters
Year of birth missing (living people)

People from West Godavari district
Screenwriters from Andhra Pradesh
Nandi Award winners
Indian screenwriters